Peter Karl David Chase (born 9 October 1993) is an Irish cricketer who played for Durham County Cricket Club. He is a right-arm medium-fast bowler who also bats right handed. In December 2018, he was one of nineteen players to be awarded a central contract by Cricket Ireland for the 2019 season. In June 2022, Chase retired from international cricket.

Domestic career
He made his first-class debut for the county in August 2014 against Nottinghamshire.

He made his Twenty20 cricket debut for Leinster Lightning in the 2017 Inter-Provincial Trophy on 26 May 2017. He was the leading wicket-taker for Leinster Lightning in the 2018 Inter-Provincial Championship, with thirteen dismissals in four matches.

International career
He made his One Day International (ODI) debut for Ireland against Scotland in the Dubai Triangular Series in the United Arab Emirates on 19 January 2015, although the match was abandoned after the toss was made. In June 2016, he was named in Ireland's ODI squad for their series against Afghanistan, scheduled to take place the following month. In February 2017 he was added to Ireland's Twenty20 International (T20I) squad for their series against Afghanistan in India.

He made his Twenty20 International (T20I) debut for Ireland against Scotland on 16 June 2018. A month later, he bowled the best death over in t20i history when he dismissed both MS Dhoni and Virat Kohli in Malahide. In June 2019, he was named in the Ireland Wolves squad for their home series against the Scotland A cricket team. On 10 July 2020, Chase was named in Ireland's 21-man squad to travel to England to start training behind closed doors for the ODI series against the England cricket team.

In February 2021, Chase was named in the Ireland Wolves' squad for their tour to Bangladesh.

References

External links
 
 

1993 births
Living people
Irish cricketers
Ireland One Day International cricketers
Ireland Twenty20 International cricketers
Durham cricketers
Cricketers from County Dublin
Cricketers at the 2015 Cricket World Cup
Leinster Lightning cricketers